Polites sonora, the Sonoran skipper or western long dash, is a butterfly in the family Hesperiidae. It is found along the Pacific coast of the U.S., reaching Canada only in the extreme southern interior of British Columbia.

The wingspan is 25–27 mm.

There is one generation in Canada from  mid-July to mid-August in British Columbia.

The larvae feed on grasses, possibly Idaho fescue (Festuca idahoensis). Adults feed on nectar from flowers including white-flowered thistles.

Subspecies
P. s. sonora
P. s. siris (Edwards, 1881) – Dog Star skipper
P. s. utahensis (Skinner, 1911)
P. s. flaviventris Austin, 1998

References

External links
Sonoran Skipper, Butterflies and Moths of North America

Butterflies of North America
Polites (butterfly)
Butterflies described in 1872
Taxa named by Samuel Hubbard Scudder